Sarah Marshall Kernochan (born December 30, 1947) is an American documentarian, film director, screenwriter and novelist. She is the recipient of several prestigious awards, including two Academy Awards (Documentary Feature for Marjoe in 1973 and Documentary Short Subject for Thoth in 2002)

Early life 
Kernochan was born in New York City, the daughter of Adelaide (Chatfield-Taylor), a UNESCO consultant, and John Marshall Kernochan, a Columbia Law School professor. Her maternal grandfather was Wayne Chatfield-Taylor, Under Secretary of Commerce and Assistant Secretary of the Treasury under President Franklin D. Roosevelt. Her maternal great-grandparents included writers Hobart Chatfield-Taylor and Anna De Koven. Her great-great-grand father was Illinois Senator and XIT Ranch owner Charles B. Farwell. Her paternal grandfather was composer Marshall Kernochan.

She graduated from Rosemary Hall (now Choate Rosemary Hall) in 1965, where Kernochan was a classmate of Glenn Close, and attended Sarah Lawrence College in 1966.

Career
After Sarah Lawrence, she worked as a ghostwriter for The Village Voice for about a year.  After quitting that job, she became interested in documentary film-making and soon gained national prominence in the United States as co-director and co-producer with Howard Smith of the 1972 film Marjoe (about evangelist Marjoe Gortner), which won an Academy Award for Documentary Feature.

Kernochan's first screen credit as a screenwriter came with the 1986 film 9½ Weeks. She followed that film with the script for Dancers (1987), starring Mikhail Baryshnikov and directed by Herbert Ross, which chronicled the backstage drama of a ballet company (played by American Ballet Theatre dancers) and their director during the staging of the ballet Giselle.

By the time she was brought in to work on the 1993 film Sommersby, she had become known for a particular style of writing in Hollywood. She commented in an interview with Salon.com:
I think people know that there's no point in calling me in if you want the other kind of women characters: a featureless "help me" character, or the saint, the whore — you know, any of the archetypes. I don't think all women are powerful, intelligent, any of those things. I just require that female characters be very real, that they have all the dimensions that the male characters do.

Since then, she has been primarily a screenwriter for such films as Dancers (1987); Impromptu (1991), the debut film directed by her husband  James Lapine with a script she characterized as "maybe the best thing that I will ever do"; Sommersby (1993); wrote and directed The Hairy Bird (1998); co-wrote 
the story for What Lies Beneath (2000); and directed Thoth (2002) and wrote Learning to Drive (2014).

Her second documentary, Thoth, also won an Academy Award in 2002, this time for Best Documentary Short Subject. She has taught screenwriting at Emerson College.

In August 2014, her feature script Learning to Drive, based on a New Yorker story by Katha Pollitt, went before cameras. The film, starring Ben Kingsley and Patricia Clarkson, was released in the US on August 21, 2015.

Novels
In 1977, Kernochan's novel Dry Hustle ( in hard cover,  in paperback) was published.  It was reprinted as an ebook in 2011. In June 2011, Kernochan released her first novel in over 35 years entitled Jane Was Here. A mysterious young woman, calling herself Jane, arrives in the small rundown community of Graynier, Massachusetts. She can point out the house where she grew up, though she has never been to Graynier in her life. Jane carries with her the fragmentary memory of her former life, and refuses to adjust to her new identity. Thus begins Jane's mission, to retrieve the puzzle pieces of a former life, groping her way through the past and the present simultaneously.

Music career
Sarah is also a singer, lyricist, and composer. During the next two years after the release of Marjoe, she released two albums on RCA Records as a singer-songwriter, House of Pain and Beat Around the Bush.

Kernochan released her third album as a singer-songwriter, "Decades of Demos," in 2013. She also wrote the musical Sleeparound Town, which was a show about puberty and featured five adolescents.

Personal life
Kernochan is married to American stage director James Lapine, a Pulitzer Prize and three-time Tony Award winner. The couple's daughter is food and health writer Phoebe Lapine.

References

External links

1947 births
Film directors from New York City
Writers from New York City
Choate Rosemary Hall alumni
Living people
Singers from New York City
Sarah Lawrence College alumni
American women screenwriters
Directors of Best Documentary Feature Academy Award winners
American documentary filmmakers
Screenwriters from New York (state)
American women documentary filmmakers
Singer-songwriters from New York (state)
21st-century American women